Nematus spiraeae is a species of sawfly in the family Tenthredinidae, known as the aruncus sawfly and sometimes the spiraea sawfly. It is native to central and northern Europe and was first recorded in Britain in 1924. Its larvae feed on the leaves of goat's beard (Aruncus dioicus).

Description
The antennae, head and thorax are brownish-black and the abdomen yellowish-brown, the underside being paler than the upper side. The wings are membranous with brown veins and the tegulae are pale-coloured. The head is greenish-brown to brown.

Life cycle
Aruncus sawflies are all females, breeding by parthenogenesis. The adults emerge in late spring and eggs are laid on the underside of the leaves of goat's beard (Aruncus dioicus) shortly afterwards. Eggs hatch a week later, releasing gregarious larvae, which consume leaf tissue between the main veins. Metamorphosis occurs after four or five weeks in the soil, each pupa protected by silken cocoons. Adults emerge in late July and August producing a second generation of larvae, and occasionally a third generation. Those larvae descend to the ground late in the year, overwinter as pre-pupae, and pupate in the spring.

Damage and control
In heavy infestations, leaves may be skeletonized except for their main veins, and the plants may become completely defoliated. The larvae can be picked off by hand, or in heavier infestations, chemical pesticides can be used. Organic products such as pyrethrum will control small larvae but more powerful synthetic insecticides are needed when the larvae are large.

References

External links

Tenthredinidae
Agricultural pest insects
Insects described in 1883
Taxa named by Ernst Gustav Zaddach
Hymenoptera of Europe